20 Supersucessos (20 Super Hits in English) is a compilation album from Banda Calypso released in 2005, recalling the achievements of his first 3 albums.

Track listing

 Príncipe Encantado
 Chamo Por Você
 Me Telefona
 Love You Mon'Amour
 Fórmula Mágica
 Desfaz As Malas
 Estrela Dourada
 Odalisca
 Como Uma Virgem
 Senhorita
 Solidão
 Amor Nas Estrelas
 Dois Corações
 Disse Adeus
 Sem Você
 Zouk Love
 Tia Mariquinha / Vai Buscar A Flor
 Só Vai Dar Eu E Você
 Dudu
 Cúmbia do Amor

References

2005 compilation albums
Banda Calypso albums